Aleksandr Alibegovich Chibirov (born 28 February 1992) is a Russian former football defender.

Club career
He made his debut in the Russian Second Division for FC Kolomna on 18 July 2013 in a game against FC Znamya Truda Orekhovo-Zuyevo.

He made his Russian Football Premier League debut on 21 March 2015 for FC Arsenal Tula in a game against PFC CSKA Moscow.

References

External links
 Career summary by sportbox.ru

1992 births
Footballers from Moscow
Living people
Russian footballers
Association football defenders
FC Chernomorets Novorossiysk players
Russian Premier League players
FC Arsenal Tula players
FC Tekstilshchik Ivanovo players